Ibad Muhamadu (born 22 February 1982) is a Dutch former professional footballer.

Career

Europe
When Muhamadu was young, he moved with his parents from Amsterdam to Hoorn, where he started playing football. He got his first professional contract with FC Twente. When René Vandereycken became head coach of Twente, Muhamadu was loaned to Cambuur.

He went to MVV in 2004. After his time in Maastricht he got transferred to the Jupiler League at Cercle Brugge. However, due to lack of convincing results, Muhamadu was never able to achieve a regular spot in the starting eleven. He went to FC Dordrecht, where he would later also find his Dutch former Cercle Brugge teammate Brian Pinas.

In May 2008, Muhamadu signed a contract with Willem II Tilburg and left the club after one year to sign with Dynamo Dresden on 9 June 2009. After just two months at Dynamo, and three league appearances, his contract was annulled in August 2009. He returned to Dordrecht a few days later.

North America
In August 2010, Muhamadu signed with the American second division club, Portland Timbers, who joined Major League Soccer in 2011.

Return to Europe
In December 2010, he signed with Dutch second division club Helmond Sport on an amateur contract. He will join amateur side SV Spakenburg from 1 July 2011.

Personal
Muhamadu is of Ghanaian and Surinamese descent. Roland Alberg is his younger brother.

References

External links
 Portland Timbers bio

1982 births
Living people
Dutch footballers
Association football forwards
Footballers from Amsterdam
People from Hoorn 
AZ Alkmaar players
FC Twente players
SC Cambuur players
MVV Maastricht players
Cercle Brugge K.S.V. players
FC Dordrecht players
Willem II (football club) players
Dynamo Dresden players
Helmond Sport players
Dutch people of Ghanaian descent
Dutch sportspeople of Surinamese descent
Eredivisie players
Eerste Divisie players
Belgian Pro League players
Expatriate footballers in Belgium
Portland Timbers (2001–2010) players
SV Spakenburg players
Dutch expatriate footballers
Expatriate footballers in Germany
Expatriate soccer players in the United States
USSF Division 2 Professional League players
3. Liga players
HVV Hollandia players
Footballers from North Holland
Dutch expatriate sportspeople in the United States
Dutch expatriate sportspeople in Germany
Dutch expatriate sportspeople in Belgium